The Journal des débats (French for: Journal of Debates) was a French newspaper, published between 1789 and 1944 that changed title several times. Created shortly after the first meeting of the Estates-General of 1789, it was, after the outbreak of the French Revolution, the exact record of the debates of the National Assembly, under the title Journal des Débats et des Décrets ("Journal of Debates and Decrees").

Published weekly rather than daily, it was headed for nearly forty years by Bertin l'Aîné and was owned for a long time by the Bertin family. During the First Empire it was opposed to Napoleon and had a new title imposed on it, the Journal de l'Empire.

During the first Bourbon Restoration (1813–1814), the Journal took the title Journal des Débats Politiques et Littéraires, and, under the second Restoration, it took a conservative rather than reactionary position. Under Charles X and his entourage, the Journal changed to a position supporting the liberal opposition represented by the Doctrinaires (Guizot, Royer-Collard, etc.) (1827–1829).

The Journal des Débats was the most read newspaper of the Restoration and the July Monarchy, before being surpassed by Émile de Girardin's La Presse and later by Le Petit Journal. The many contributions established the Journals reputation as a major influence on French culture, and especially French literature for the first half of the 19th century.

During the German occupation of France in World War II, the Journal continued to be published, which caused it to be suppressed after the Liberation of Paris in 1944.

Famous contributors

 Henry Aron
 Gustave Babin
 Hector Berlioz
 Maurice Blanchot
 Castil-Blaze
 Brada
 François-René de Chateaubriand
 Alexandre Dumas, père
 Charles-Marie de Féletz
 Léon Foucault
 Julien Louis Geoffroy
 Bernard Adolphe Granier de Cassagnac
 Victor Hugo
 Jules Janin
 Conrad Malte-Brun
 Charles Nodier
 Ferdinando Petruccelli della Gattina
 Ernest Reyer
 Eugène Sue
 Madame Sorgue
 George Barbu Știrbei
 Jean-Baptiste Louvet de Couvray

References

 Alfred Nettement, Histoire politique, anecdotique et littéraire du « Journal des débats », Dentu, Paris, 1842. 
 Le Livre du centenaire du « Journal des débats », Plon, Paris, 1889. 
 André-Jean Tudesq, « Le Journal des débats au temps de Guizot », Politique, avril-juin 1959. 
 Ruth Jakoby, Das Feuilleton des « Journal des débats » von 1814 bis 1830: ein Beitrag zur Literaturdiskussion der Restauration, G. Narr, Tübingen, 1988. .

External links
 Le Journal des débats digital archives from 1800 to 1805, from 1805 to 1814 and from 1814 to 1944 in Gallica, the digital library of the BnF

1789 establishments in France
1944 disestablishments in France
Publications established in 1789
Publications disestablished in 1944
Defunct newspapers published in France
Defunct weekly newspapers
Newspapers of the Vichy regime
July Monarchy
Newspapers of the French Revolution
Bourbon Restoration
Weekly newspapers published in France